Chocolatera is a type of high-necked metal pot shaped like a pitcher used for the traditional preparation of hot chocolate drinks in Spain, Latin America, and the Philippines (where it is spelled tsokolatera). It is used in combination with a molinillo baton to froth the chocolate.

See also
List of chocolate drinks

References

Cooking appliances
Colombian cuisine
Chocolate